Mitrella may refer to:

 Mitrella (gastropod), a genus of mollusks of the family Columbellidae
 Mitrella (plant), a genus of plants of the family Annonaceae